Acrojana simillima is a moth in the family Eupterotidae. It was described by Rothschild in 1932. It is found in Sierra Leone.

The wingspan about 132 mm. Adults are similar to Acrojana splendida, with a salmon-red area on the hindwings.

References

Moths described in 1932
Janinae